The kuponi ( k’up’oni, "coupon"; ISO 4217: GEK) was the currency of Georgia. It was introduced on 5 April 1993, replacing the Russian ruble at par. This currency was temporary, with no coins nor subdivisions. It also suffered from hyperinflation.

Banknotes
Kuponi banknotes were issued in five series: four in 1993 and one in 1994. Each denomination was introduced in no more than two series.

First 1993 series

Second 1993 series

Third 1993 series

Fourth 1993 series

1994 series

Abandonment
On 2 October 1995, the government of Eduard Shevardnadze replaced the provisional coupon currency with the lari, at a rate of one million to one. It has remained fairly stable since then.

References

Currencies of Europe
Economy of Georgia (country)
Currencies introduced in 1993